In computational complexity theory, the average-case complexity of an algorithm is the amount of some computational resource (typically time) used by the algorithm, averaged over all possible inputs. It is frequently contrasted with worst-case complexity which considers the maximal complexity of the algorithm over all possible inputs.

There are three primary motivations for studying average-case complexity. First, although some problems may be intractable in the worst-case, the inputs which elicit this behavior may rarely occur in practice, so the average-case complexity may be a more accurate measure of an algorithm's performance. Second, average-case complexity analysis provides tools and techniques to generate hard instances of problems which can be utilized in areas such as cryptography and derandomization.  Third, average-case complexity allows discriminating the most efficient algorithm in practice among algorithms of equivalent best case complexity (for instance Quicksort).

Average-case analysis requires a notion of an "average" input to an algorithm, which leads to the problem of devising a probability distribution over inputs. Alternatively, a randomized algorithm can be used. The analysis of such algorithms leads to the related notion of an expected complexity.

History and background

The average-case performance of algorithms has been studied since modern notions of computational efficiency were developed in the 1950s. Much of this initial work focused on problems for which worst-case polynomial time algorithms were already known. In 1973, Donald Knuth published Volume 3 of the Art of Computer Programming which extensively surveys average-case performance of algorithms for problems solvable in worst-case polynomial time, such as sorting and median-finding.

An efficient algorithm for -complete problems is generally characterized as one which runs in polynomial time for all inputs; this is equivalent to requiring efficient worst-case complexity. However, an algorithm which is inefficient on a "small" number of inputs may still be efficient for "most" inputs that occur in practice. Thus, it is desirable to study the properties of these algorithms where the average-case complexity may differ from the worst-case complexity and find methods to relate the two.

Definitions

Efficient average-case complexity

The first task is to precisely define what is meant by an algorithm which is efficient "on average". An initial attempt might define an efficient average-case algorithm as one which runs in expected polynomial time over all possible inputs. Such a definition has various shortcomings; in particular, it is not robust to changes in the computational model. Intuitively, any definition of average-case efficiency should capture the idea that  is efficient-on-average if and only if  is efficient on-average. Suppose, however, that the inputs are drawn randomly from the uniform distribution of strings with length , and that  runs in time  on all inputs except the string  for which  takes time .

To create a more robust definition of average-case efficiency, it makes sense to allow an algorithm  to run longer than polynomial time on some inputs but the fraction of inputs on which  requires larger and larger running time becomes smaller and smaller. This intuition is captured in the following formula for average polynomial running time, which balances the polynomial trade-off between running time and fraction of inputs:

Alternatively, this can be written as

Distributional problem
The next step is to define the "average" input to a particular problem. This is achieved by associating the inputs of each problem with a particular probability distribution. That is, an "average-case" problem consists of a language  and an associated probability distribution  which forms the pair . The two most common classes of distributions which are allowed are:

Polynomial-time computable distributions (-computable): these are distributions for which it is possible to compute the cumulative density of any given input . More formally, given a probability distribution  and a string  it is possible to compute the value  in polynomial time. This implies that  is also computable in polynomial time.
Polynomial-time samplable distributions (-samplable): these are distributions from which it is possible to draw random samples in polynomial time.

These two formulations, while similar, are not equivalent. If a distribution is -computable it is also -samplable, but the converse is not true if  ≠ .

AvgP and distNP
The class  is occasionally called  in the literature.

Reductions between distributional problems

(Correctness)  if and only if 

The domination condition enforces the notion that if problem  is hard on average, then  is also hard on average. Intuitively, a reduction should provide a way to solve an instance  of problem  by computing  and feeding the output to the algorithm which solves . Without the domination condition, this may not be possible since the algorithm which solves  in polynomial time on average may take super-polynomial time on a small number of inputs but  may map these inputs into a much larger set of  so that algorithm  no longer runs in polynomial time on average.

DistNP-complete problems
The average-case analogue to -completeness is -completeness.

An example of a -complete problem is the Bounded Halting Problem, defined as follows:

In his original paper, Levin showed an example of a distributional tiling problem that is average-case -complete. A survey of known -complete problems is available online.

One area of active research involves finding new -complete problems. However, finding such problems can be complicated due to a result of Gurevich which shows that any distributional problem with a flat distribution cannot be -complete unless  = . (A flat distribution  is one for which there exists an  such that for any , .) A result by Livne shows that all natural -complete problems have -complete versions. However, the goal of finding a natural distributional problem that is -complete has not yet been achieved.

Applications

Sorting algorithms
As mentioned above, much early work relating to average-case complexity focused on problems for which polynomial-time algorithms already existed, such as sorting.

Cryptography
For most problems, average-case complexity analysis is undertaken to find efficient algorithms for a problem that is considered difficult in the worst-case. In cryptographic applications, however, the opposite is true: the worst-case complexity is irrelevant; we instead want a guarantee that the average-case complexity of every algorithm which "breaks" the cryptographic scheme is inefficient.

Thus, all secure cryptographic schemes rely on the existence of one-way functions. Although the existence of one-way functions is still an open problem, many candidate one-way functions are based on hard problems such as integer factorization or computing the discrete log. Note that it is not desirable for the candidate function to be -complete since this would only guarantee that there is likely no efficient algorithm for solving the problem in the worst case; what we actually want is a guarantee that no efficient algorithm can solve the problem over random inputs (i.e. the average case).

Other results
In 1990, Impagliazzo and Levin showed that if there is an efficient average-case algorithm for a -complete problem under the uniform distribution, then there is an average-case algorithm for every problem in  under any polynomial-time samplable distribution. Applying this theory to natural distributional problems remains an outstanding open question.

In 1992, Ben-David et al. showed that if all languages in  have good-on-average decision algorithms, they also have good-on-average search algorithms. Thus, cryptographic one-way functions can exist only if there are  problems over the uniform distribution that are hard on average for decision algorithms.

In 2003, Bogdanov and Trevisan generalized this result to arbitrary non-adaptive reductions. These results show that it is unlikely that any association can be made between average-case complexity and worst-case complexity via reductions.

See also
 Probabilistic analysis of algorithms
NP-complete problems
Worst-case complexity
Amortized analysis
Best, worst and average case

References

Further reading
The literature of average case complexity includes the following work:
.
.
.
.
.
. See also 1989 draft.
.
.
.
.
.
.
Paul E. Black, "Θ", in Dictionary of Algorithms and Data Structures[online]Paul E. Black, ed., U.S. National Institute of Standards and Technology. 17 December 2004.Retrieved Feb. 20/09.
Christos Papadimitriou (1994). Computational Complexity. Addison-Wesley.

Randomized algorithms
Analysis of algorithms